Taiwo Ogunnimo is a Nigerian Nollywood producer, public relations personnel and a university lecturer. In 2022, she won the 2022 AMVCA short film category award with her I Am The Prostitute Mama Described short film beating the other six contestants. She studied English in Babcock University and then MSc in Literature from the University of Lagos. She further went to the United Kingdom for a second masters in Coventry University where she graduated with a distinction in Communications, culture and media.

References

External links 

     Taiwo Ogunnimo on LinkedIn 

Living people
Nigerian film producers
Nigerian film directors
Nigerian academics
University of Lagos alumni
Babcock University
1995 births